The Channel Islands Electricity Grid (CIEG) is the joint company set up in 1998 between Guernsey Electricity and Jersey Electricity to operate and manage the submarine cables between mainland Europe and the Channel Islands.

The grid physically comprises a network of high voltage (90 kV, 3-phase, 50 Hz) submarine and underground cables linking the French electricity grid to the electricity systems on the islands of Jersey and Guernsey. The grid enables electricity generated from renewable sources in France to be transmitted to Jersey and Guernsey.

Development 
The CIEG is continuing to develop the undersea cable network with additional subsea cables between the islands and France being devised to give both Guernsey and Jersey greater security and better affordability, as they will give the islands the opportunity to increase the amount of imported energy.

Long term agreements with Électricité de France (EdF) ensure the imported electricity is low carbon. Ninety percent of Guernsey’s electricity is imported from the grid.

Co-operating through the CIEG means the islands can work together towards improving the reliability of the grid system.

Cable connections

Future 
 Possible - France to Guernsey 
 Unlikely - Guernsey to Sark

See also 

 Jersey Electricity Company
 Guernsey Electricity
 List of power stations in the British Crown Dependencies

External links

Guernsey Electricity's website
Jersey Electricity's website

References

Electric power companies of the Channel Islands
Infrastructure in the Channel Islands
Submarine power cables
Electric power infrastructure in the United Kingdom
1998 establishments in the United Kingdom